Spira may refer to:

 Spira (car), a three-wheeled motor vehicle
 Spira (confectionery), a Cadbury chocolate bar in a helix shape
 Spira (name), including a list of people with the name
 Spira (Final Fantasy), the fictional world of the role-playing game
 Spira (footwear company), an American shoe manufacturer 
 Speyer, medieval name Spira, a city in Germany

See also

 Spiro (disambiguation)
 Spyra, a surname
 Spyro
 Spira mirabilis, the logarithmic spiral